Tatjana Maria was the defending champion, but decided not to participate this year.

Catherine Bellis won the title, defeating Jesika Malečková 6–2, 1–6, 6–3 in the final

Seeds

Draw

Finals

Top half

Bottom half

References
Main Draw

Tevlin Women's Challenger
Tevlin Women's Challenger